Philip Lawson (born 19 February 1957) is a Grammy award-winning British composer and arranger, mostly of a cappella and sacred music. For 18 years he was a baritone with the King's Singers and the group's principal arranger for the last fifteen years of that period. In 2009 the group's album "Simple Gifts", on which Lawson arranged 10 out of 15 tracks, won the Grammy award for "Best Classical Crossover Album". In February 2012, he left the King's Singers to concentrate on his writing career.

Background
Philip Lawson was born in Crawley, West Sussex, England, and attended Hazelwick School.  He was not from a musical family but a chance meeting introduced him to the boys' choir of Worth Church which sparked his interest in music. He went on to study Music at the University of York under Wilfrid Mellers and to sing counter-tenor in the choir of York Minster, under Francis Jackson.

Singing career
Lawson switched from counter-tenor to baritone in 1978 at the age of 21. He moved to London upon graduating and worked for 3 years as a soloist and with choirs including The BBC Singers, The Taverner Choir, Opera Rara and the choirs of St. Paul's Cathedral, Westminster Abbey, and Southwark Cathedral.

From 1982 to 1993, Lawson was a Lay Clerk in Salisbury Cathedral Choir under Richard Seal and from 1989 was Director of Music of Chafyn Grove Preparatory School. During this time he also performed many times with The Sixteen, the English Concert and CM90, and worked as pianist and arranger for a local dance band.

In June 1993, Lawson successfully auditioned for the part of second baritone with The King's Singers, replacing founder-member Simon Carrington. In 1996 he volunteered to fill the vacancy for first baritone, and continued to sing this part until his departure in February 2012.

Composing and arranging
Lawson contributed over 50 arrangements to the repertoire of The King's Singers. He has 10 arrangements on the group's Grammy winning album "Simple Gifts", recorded in 2008 at the studio of Status Quo lead guitarist Francis Rossi. 
Nominations
In 2000, Lawson was nominated for a Grammy for Best Classical Crossover Album "Circle Of Life" (Kiss From A Rose; Kokomo; It Had To Be You, Etc.) (Album). Eight years later in 2008, he won a Grammy with the album "Simple Gifts" winning for Best Classical Crossover Album at the Grammy Award Ceremony held in Los Angeles in February 2009. 

Lawson also wrote the lyrics to "Born on a New Day", the highly successful Christmas version of the King's Singers best-selling hit arrangement of "You are the New Day".

Lawson is also a composer of choral music in his own right with more than two hundred published works, and has a busy schedule of commissions from choirs and a cappella groups. Most of his works are in print with Hal Leonard Corporation in the USA, but he also has works published by OUP, Schott Music, Boosey and Hawkes, Walton Music, Peters Edition, The Lorenz Corporation, Morningstar Music, Pavane Publications, Alliance Music, Banks Music, Alfred Music, Encore Publications and Schoolplay Productions.

Conducting
Since September 2016 Philip Lawson has been Musical Director of The Romsey Singers, a chamber choir based in Romsey, near Southampton,   and in 2021 was appointed Co-Conductor of The Farrant Singers, a chamber choir in Salisbury founded by Richard Lloyd in 1958.

Teaching
Philip Lawson teaches choral singing, composing and arranging, working with choirs and a cappella groups in Europe and the USA, and on an individual basis with young composers and arrangers. He is on the staff of the Vocal Departments of Wells Cathedral specialist music school and the University of Bristol. In 2014 and 2016, he was one of two lecturers at the European Seminar For Young Composers held in Aosta, Italy, sponsored by the Italian national choral foundation Feniarco, and by Europa Cantat. He has been described by Choir & Organ magazine as a "choral polymath".

Discography
Philip Lawson appears on all King's Singers recordings from 1993 to 2012:

As second baritone
 English Renaissance
 Sermons and Devotions
 Ligeti Nonsense Madrigals (part of the Sony Complete Ligeti collection)
 Spirit Voices (includes guest artists Bruce Johnston, Mike Love, Midge Ure, Dewey Bunnell, Gerry Beckley and James Warren)

As first baritone
CDs
 Runnin' Wild (as guests of the Boston Pops Orchestra, conductor Keith Lockhart)
 Circle of Life (with the Metropol Orchestra, conductor Carl Davis) – Grammy nomination 2000
 Nightsong (with pianist Roger Vignoles)
 Streetsongs (with percussionist Evelyn Glennie)
 Firewater (with Andrew Lawrence-King and the Harp Consort)
 Music of the Beatles (with the Cincinnati Pops Orchestra, conductor Erich Kunzel)
 The Triumphs of Oriana
 Christmas
 Gesualdo Tenebrae Responsories
 Treason and Dischord (with Concordia)
 Sacred Bridges (with Sarband Ensemble)
 Spem in Alium
 The Quiet Heart
 Landscape and Time
 The Golden Age
 Simple Gifts – Grammy win 2009 – Best Crossover album
 Live at the BBC Proms
 Reflections
 Romance du Soir
 From the Heart
 Pachelbel Vespers (with Charivari Ensemble)
 Swimming over London
 In this quiet moment
 Christmas Oratorio (with the WDR Big Band)
 Joy to the world
 High Flight
 Light and Gold (with Eric Whitacre) – Grammy win 2012
 Royal Rhymes and Rounds

DVDs
 A workshop video
 From Byrd to the Beatles (live at Cadogan Hall)
 Live at the BBC Proms – Midem award 2010 – Best Concert DVD
 Joy to the world

References

External links
 Philip Lawson official website
 Gard Books website
 The King's Singers website
 Romsey Singers website

1957 births
People educated at Hazelwick School
Alumni of the University of York
English composers
English male singers
Living people
People from Crawley
The King's Singers members